Ilya Matalyha (born 5 May 1984) is a Belarusian professional footballer who is currently playing for Veles-2020 Vitebsk.

External links

1984 births
Living people
People from Babruysk
Sportspeople from Mogilev Region
Belarusian footballers
Association football goalkeepers
Expatriate footballers in the Czech Republic
Belarusian expatriate footballers
Czech First League players
FC Starye Dorogi players
FC Belshina Bobruisk players
FC Dnepr Mogilev players
1. FC Slovácko players
FC Smorgon players
FC Gorodeya players
FC Zhlobin players
FC Sputnik Rechitsa players
FC Orsha players